William Oldfield may refer to:

 William Allan Oldfield (1874–1928), United States Representative from Arkansas
 William Oldfield (UK politician) (1881–1961), British trade unionist and Labour Member of Parliament
 Bert Oldfield, Australian cricketer